Cham railway station could refer to:

 Cham railway station (Switzerland) in Cham, Zug, Switzerland
 Cham (Oberpf) station in Cham, Bavaria, Germany